This is a list of castles in Argyll and Bute.

List

See also

Castles in Scotland
List of castles in Scotland
List of listed buildings in Argyll and Bute

Notes

References
 Coventry, Martin (2001) The Castles of Scotland, 3rd Ed. Scotland: Goblinshead 
 Coventry, Martin (2010) Castles of the Clans Scotland: Goblinshead 
 Pattullo, Nan (1974) Castles, Houses and Gardens of Scotland Edinburgh: Denburn Press

Castles in Argyll and Bute
Argyll and Bute